Undecylprodigiosin is an alkaloid produced by some Actinomycetes bacteria. It is a member of the prodiginines group of natural products and has been investigated for potential antimalarial activity.

Natural sources
Undecylprodigiosin is a secondary metabolite found in some Actinomycetes, for example Actinomadura madurae, Streptomyces coelicolor and Streptomyces longisporus.

Production

Biosynthesis
The biosynthesis of undecylprodigiosin starts with PCP apoprotein which is transformed into the holoprotein using acetyl CoA and PPtase then adenylation occurs utilizing L-proline and ATP. The resulting molecule is then oxidized by dehydrogenase enzyme. Elongation by decarboxylative condensation with malonyl CoA is followed by another decarboxylative condensation with L-serine using α-oxamine synthase (OAS) domain. The compound is then cyclized, oxidized with dehydrogenase and methylated with SAM to give 4-methoxy-2,2′-bipyrrole-5-carboxaldehyde (MBC) intermediate which react with 2-undecylpyrrole (2-UP) to give undecylprodigiosin.

Laboratory 
The first total synthesis of the undecylprodigiosin was published in 1966, confirming the chemical structure. As with the biosynthesis, the key intermediate was MBC.

Uses 
As with other prodiginines, the compound has been investigated for its pharmaceutical potential as anticancer, immunosuppressant, or antimalarial agent.

References 

Streptomyces
Alkaloids
Pyrroles